Ashti (official name: Ashti Dhotar Joda) is a major village in Partur taluka of Jalna district in Maharashtra state of India.

Demographics 
 Ashti village has total 2594 families residing with a population of 14,020 of which 7,127 are males and 6,893 are females as per Population Census 2011.
 Average Sex Ratio of Ashti village is 967 which is higher than Maharashtra state average of 929. 
 Ashti village has lower literacy rate compared to Maharashtra. In 2011, literacy rate of Ashti village was 67.94% compared to 82.34% of Maharashtra. In Ashti Male literacy stands at 75.23% while female literacy rate was 60.42%.
 Schedule Caste (SC) constitutes 9.08% while Schedule Tribe (ST) were 1.53% of total population in Ashti village.

Transport
Ashti is surrounded by Sailu Taluka and Pathri Taluka towards East, Ghansawangi Taluka towards west and Majalgaon Taluka towards South.

There is no railway station at Ashti. Nearest railway stations are, Partur, Usmanpur, Satona(24 km).

Aurangabad Airport is the nearest airport from the village.

Administration
 Though Ashti is in Jalna district, it comes under Parbhani Loksabha Constituency for Lok Sabha or General Elections of India.  The current Member of Parliament is Sanjay(Bandu) Jadhav of Shiv Sena party. 
 Ashti comes under Partur-Mantha constituency for Legislative Assembly elections of Maharashtra.  The current Member of Legislative Assembly (MLA) from this area is Babanrao Lonikar of Bhartiya Janata Party, who is also cabinet minister in Government of Maharashtra.

References

Villages in Jalna district
Jalna district